Metasphenisca tetrachaeta is a species of tephritid or fruit flies in the genus Metasphenisca of the family Tephritidae.

Distribution
Zambia, Zimbabwe, Congo, South Africa.

References

Tephritinae
Insects described in 1918
Taxa named by Mario Bezzi
Diptera of Africa